José Luis Muñoz Soria (born 10 August 1948) is a Mexican politician affiliated with the PRD. He served as Deputy of the LXII Legislature of the Mexican Congress representing the Federal District, and previously served in the V Legislature of the Legislative Assembly of the Federal District.

References

1948 births
Living people
Politicians from Guanajuato
Party of the Democratic Revolution politicians
People from Pénjamo
21st-century Mexican politicians
Instituto Politécnico Nacional alumni
Members of the Congress of Mexico City
Deputies of the LXII Legislature of Mexico
Members of the Chamber of Deputies (Mexico) for Mexico City